Southstar Drug is a chain of drugstores in the Philippines. It was established in 1937 as a small business venture engaged in the retail of Chinese herbal medicines, located in Naga City, Camarines Sur in Southern Luzon, Philippines. Southstar Drug was formerly known as Southern Drug (1937–1950) and New South Star Drug (1950–1990s). It faced competition from Watsons (which entered the Philippine market in 1883) and Mercury Drug (the 2nd oldest Philippine drugstore chain being established in 1945, or eight years after Southstar Drug).

Presently, Southstar Drug (also known as SSD) belongs to the top 1,000 corporations of the Philippines. It has spread out to more than 500 branches nationwide. Since 2012, Southstar Drug is owned by Robinsons Retail Holdings, Inc. (the Philippines' second largest retail chain).

From its origins in Southern Luzon, Southstar Drug has expanded its business by first putting up more stores in Southern Luzon, then in Northern Luzon (following the acquisition of Manson Drug chain in 2011) and the islands of Mindoro, Masbate, and Virac. Southstar recently expanded in the Visayas region in 2010 (through its region's first branch in Samar). Southstar sells fresh medicines and goods in remote communities.

Another well-known pharmacy chain in the Philippines is Rose Pharmacy which, in 2020, also partnered with Robinsons Retail Holdings, Inc.

References

Gokongwei Group
Pharmacies of the Philippines
Pharmacy brands
Retail companies established in 1937
Companies based in Camarines Sur
Year of establishment missing
Philippine brands